Horton is a civil parish in the district of Staffordshire Moorlands, Staffordshire, England. It contains 29 listed buildings that are recorded in the National Heritage List for England.  Of these, four are at Grade II*, the middle of the three grades, and the others are at Grade II, the lowest grade.  The parish contains the villages of Horton and Rudyard, and the surrounding countryside.  Most of the listed buildings are houses, including a former manor house and a country house, and associated structures, cottages, farmhouses and farm buildings.  The other listed buildings include a church, an enclosure in the churchyard, a clapper bridge, and a former watermill.


Key

Buildings

References

Citations

Sources

Lists of listed buildings in Staffordshire